Sovetskaya is a rural locality (a village) in Nyuksenskoye Rural Settlement, Nyuksensky District, Vologda Oblast, Russia. The population was 46 as of 2002.

Geography 
Sovetsky is the nearest rural locality.

References 

Rural localities in Nyuksensky District